Senator Coughlin may refer to:

Edward J. Coughlin (1885–1945), New York State Senate
Kevin Coughlin (born 1970), Ohio State Senate
Lawrence Coughlin (1929–2001), Pennsylvania State Senate
Robert E. Coulson (1912–1986), Illinois State Senate